Anini-y, officially the Municipality of Anini-y, is a 4th class municipality in the province of Antique, Philippines. According to the 2020 census, it has a population of 22,018 people. Making it 14th most populous municipality in the province of Antique.

History 
During the Spanish era, Anini-y was already an independent town with a Baroque church located on the heart of its town proper. Sometime during the American period, Anini-y was integrated into the municipality of Tobias Fornier (formerly Dao). On August 5, 1949, the town of Anini-y became independent again from the municipality of Tobias Fornier.

Geography

According to the Philippine Statistics Authority, the municipality has a land area of  constituting  of the  total area of Antique.

Climate

Barangays
Anini-y is politically subdivided into 23 barangays.

The barrio of San Ramón was formerly the sitio of Igdacoton in the barrio of Magdalena.

Demographics

In the 2020 census, Anini-y had a population of 22,018.

Economy

Tourism
 Cresta de Gallo — a mountain with a shape like a rooster's crown.
 Aliwliw - the highest mountain in Anini-y located along Anini-y and Tobias Fornier border.
 Iboc River and Nasuli River - two longest rivers in Anini-y
 Nogas Island — according to local legend, this Island was formed when the two lovers Anini and Nogas had broken their promises with the fairy God Mother. While riding on a boat near the town, their boat was capsized by big waves summoned by the fairy God Mother. After which, at the spot where Nogas and Anini were last seen, a white sand island full of mangroves appeared just near beside the Anini-y town.
 Siraan Hot Spring and Health Resort — People who reside near Siraan hot spring usually take their time relaxing in a bath tub sized pool early in the morning to feel the warmness and the cool breeze of the ocean as the resort is located just along the seashore.
 San Juan Nepomuceno Parish Church  Anini-y Church — built during the Spanish era in the 19th century. The church is made of coral reefs carved into thick blocks to form an adobe and were glued using thousands of egg whites/yolks. Early locals/settlers of the town were the prime workers and carpenters of the church. Some stories tell that people of the town were forced to contribute anything such as goods and food for the Spanish priest as well as raising chicken to lay more eggs so that it will be used for building of the church.
 Bantigue Marine Sanctuary — a marine reef and sanctuary situated on the western coast of Barangay San Francisco (Dapdap). This site is the future of local tourism of the barrio.

References

External links

 [ Philippine Standard Geographic Code]

Municipalities of Antique (province)